The 2021–22 UNC Wilmington Seahawks men's basketball team represented the University of North Carolina Wilmington during the 2021–22 NCAA Division I men's basketball season. The Seahawks are led by second-year head coach Takayo Siddle. They played their home games at Trask Coliseum as part of the Colonial Athletic Association. They finished the season 27–9, 15–3 in CAA play to finish in a tie for the regular season championship with Towson. The Seahawks defeated Elon and Charleston in the CAA tournament before losing to Delaware in the championship game. They received a bid to the College Basketball Invitational tournament as the No. 9 seed. They defeated VMI, Drake, Northern Colorado, and Middle Tennessee to win the CBI championship.

Previous season
In a season limited due to the ongoing COVID-19 pandemic, the Seahawks finished the 2020–21 season with a 7–10 record and 1–6 in conference play. They lost to William & Mary in the first round of the CAA  tournament .

Roster

Schedule and results

|-
!colspan=9 style=| Exhibition
|-

|-
!colspan=9 style=| Non-conference regular season
|-

|-
!colspan=9 style=| CAA regular season

|-
!colspan=12 style=| CAA tournament

|-
!colspan=12 style=| CBI

Source:

References

UNC Wilmington Seahawks men's basketball seasons
UNC Wilmington
UNC Wilmington
UNC Wilmington
UNC Wilmington
College Basketball Invitational championship seasons